Susan Cartsonis is an American film producer and the president of Storefront Pictures. She produced Firelight, Where the Heart Is, What Women Want, Aquamarine, Beastly, and Carrie Pilby, and was the executive producer of The Mistress of Spices and No Reservations. In 2000, she was named one of the top five grossing producers of the year by The Hollywood Reporter.,  She is President of Wind Dancer Films. She is also Senior Vice President at 20th Century Fox.

Susan is a faculty member within the Maslow Family Graduate Creative Writing program at Wilkes University in Wilkes-Barre, PA.

Education
She received her MFA in dramatic writing from NYU (1984) and a bachelor of arts in theatre from UCLA.,

Filmography
She was a producer in all films unless otherwise noted.

Film

Television

References

External links

Storefront Pictures

American film producers
Living people
American women film producers
Tisch School of the Arts alumni
UCLA Film School alumni
Businesspeople from Pittsburgh
Year of birth missing (living people)